Sonay is a unisex given name in Turkish and a surname. People with the name include:

Given name
 Sonay Adem (1957–2018), Turkish Cypriot politician
 Sonay Kartal (born 2001), British tennis player

Surname
 Joseph de Sonay (1896–date of death unknown), Belgian diver

Fictional characters
 Sonay, one of the main characters in the Turkish movie Mustang

Turkish unisex given names